Krišjānis Berķis (April 26, 1884 in Īslīce parish, Bauska municipality, Courland, modern Latvia – July 29, 1942 in Perm, Russia) was a Latvian general. Rising to prominence as an officer of the Latvian Riflemen in World War I, he was promoted to the rank of general during the Latvian War of Independence, and served on the Army General Staff after the war. After the Soviet occupation of Baltic states he was deported to Siberia and died in a Gulag labor camp.

Biography 
Krišjānis Berķis was born on April 26, 1884 in the farmer's homestead Bērzkrogs, Īslīce parish, Courland. He graduated from local parish school and Bauska city school. After graduation he decided to become a soldier and entered Vilnius military school. He graduated in 1906 in the rank of podporuchik. He then served in 2nd. Finnish rifleman regiment in Helsinki. During his service in Grand Duchy of Finland he married Finnish girl Hilma Lehtonen (1887-1961).
In 1909 he was promoted to poruchik and in 1913 to stabskapitan.

First World War 

In 1914 Berķis as an officer in Finnish corps of Russian Army was deployed to front in East Prussia. He served as a company commander, later as battalion commander. He participated in battles near the Masurian lakes.
In January 1915 the Finnish Corps was deployed to south eastern front in the Carpathians. Berķis was promoted to captain and participated in many battles, including Brusilov's offensive in 1916.
In 1917 he was promoted to lieutenant colonel and after many requests was finally transferred to Latvian Rifleman units. He became battalion commander in 6th. Tukums Latvian rifleman regiment but from October he commanded the whole regiment. With his regiment he participated in Battle of Jugla securing to main Russian units safe withdrawal from Riga.
In November 1917 he refused to join Red Army and was dissmised from his post. He went to Finland to be with his family.

Latvian War of independence 

When Finnish civil war started in 1918 Berķis with his family went to Smolensk, Russia. Later however he passed through Latvia and Estonia to return to Finland. In autumn 1918 Berķis learned from newspapers about the proclamation of the Latvian republic and forming of its first military units.
In March 1919 he managed to get to Tallinn where he met delegates of the Latvian government. Soon after he met with colonel Jorģis Zemitāns and on 21 March he enlisted in the Latvian army.
He was ordered to form a Latvian reserve battalion. After two months the battalion became a regiment. Later it became 2nd. Cēsis infantry regiment and Berķis was appointed as commander.
In the May 1919 regiment was deployed to the front and participated in battles in Vidzeme. On 1 June, the regiment entered Valmiera and later Cēsis. After fighting in Battle of Cēsis the regiment chased retreating Germans until the Strazdumiža ceasefire.
On 6 July with other Latvian units, the regiment entered Riga. He participated in all battles against Bermontians and later also in liberation of Latgale.

Post-War years 

After Latvian War of independence he stayed in the military and continued his service as commander of 3rd. Latgale infantry division.
In 1925 he was promoted to general. In 1930 he graduated 8 monthlong officer courses. Later he was moved to Army HQ. Berkis was one of Prime Minister Kārlis Ulmanis' principal co-conspirators in the coup d'état of May 15, 1934. 
After the coup he was appointed commander of 2nd. Vidzeme infantry division and commander of Riga garrison.
He served as Commander-in-Chief of the Army from 1934 - 1940 and briefly became Minister of War in spring 1940. In his short term as minister he tried to promote Latvian cooperation with Estonia, Finland and even Great Britain, but it was too late.

After the Soviet Latvian occupation he was dissmised from his post and retired from the army. Together with family he managed to get to Finland, however on 12 July he decided to return to Latvia. On his way back some friends managed to discourage Berķis from such move and he stopped in Tallinn.
There he was arrested by the Soviet authorities and deported to Usollag, Molotov Oblast, Siberia, where he died in a prison hospital in 1942. His only child, Valentins, died  in Russia, and their grandson went missing.

Decorations

Latvian military Order of Lāčplēsis, all three classes (1920, 1927, 1927)
Lithuanian Order of the Cross of Vytis, 1st class
French Order of the Legion of Honour
Order of the White Rose of Finland 1st class
Cross of Liberty (Estonia)1st class
Order of Viesturs 1st class

Order of the Three Stars, 1st and 2nd classes
Orders of the Russian empire: Stanislav II, III class, Anna II, III, IV class, Vladimir IV class, Cross of St. George IV class

See also 
 List of Latvian Army generals

Sources 
 Rislakki, Jukka: Latvian kohtalonvuodet. Krisjanis Berkiksen ja Hilma Lehtosen tarina. SKS, Helsinki 2005. (With English summary)
 Rislakki, Jukka: Kur beidzas varaviksne. Jumava, Riga 2004.

References 

1884 births
1942 deaths
People from Bauska Municipality
People from Courland Governorate
Ministers of Defence of Latvia
Latvian generals
Russian military personnel of World War I
Latvian military personnel of the Latvian War of Independence
Latvian people who died in Soviet detention
Recipients of the Order of Lāčplēsis, 1st class
Recipients of the Order of Lāčplēsis, 2nd class